Choe Jong-gil, sometimes romanized as Tsche Chong-kil (April 28, 1931 in Gongju – October 19, 1973 in Seoul) was a professor at the Law College of Seoul National University. For years, the government denied any involvement in his death, but in 2002 the Presidential Truth Commission announced the results of its investigation: during interrogation by the KCIA he fell, or was thrown, from a seventh story window; he is also believed to have been tortured. In 2006 the government was ordered to pay 184 million won in damages; an intelligence agent who had accused him of spying for North Korea was ordered to pay an additional 20 million.

See also
History of South Korea
Human rights in South Korea
List of Koreans

External links
Truth Commission site, in Korean and English
"State Held Liable for Academic's 1973 Defenestration", The Chosun Ilbo, February 14, 2006.
"The Final Truth About Tsche Chong Kil", the Hankyoreh, March 19, 2004.

1931 births
1973 deaths
People from Gongju
Academic staff of Seoul National University
Seoul National University alumni